Nicholson Road railway station is an under construction station on the Thornlie–Cockburn Link in Perth, Western Australia as part of Metronet. 

The station will include a bus interchange with 7 stands and 1,000 car parking spaces. The station will be at-grade, with pedestrian and bicycle access from a new shared path along Canna Drive or via the Nicholson Road underpass, and vehicle and bus access from Tulloch Way and Panama Street. Approximately 2,350 daily boardings are predicted at Nicholson Road railway station in 2031. It is 28 minutes to Perth via the Mandurah line.

History
A station at Nicholson Road was first planned as part of the proposed Armadale line branch route of the Mandurah line. This station was ultimately not constructed as the final route was altered to a different alignment.

Construction of the station started in 2020. The first trains are now expected to run in 2024. 

At the 2021–22 State Budget, it was announced that the Thornlie–Cockburn link had been deferred by 12 months, as a result of Western Australia's skills shortage. This was alongside the deferment of 15 other state government infrastructure projects. The revised opening date is late 2024.

References

External links
 Thornlie-Cockburn Link website page for Ranford Road railway station and Nicholson Road railway station.

Proposed railway stations in Perth, Western Australia